Big Foot High School (BFHS) is a comprehensive four-year public high
school located in Wisconsin's South Central Walworth County in the Village of
Walworth. A union high school, BFHS operates as a grade
9-12 district with students coming from four K-8 districts.  BFHS is
governed by a separate, elected five-member board of education.  The
BFHS union district serves families from the villages of Fontana,
Sharon and Walworth; and the townships of Walworth, Delavan, Linn and
Sharon.

BFHS is named after the Potawatomi leader Big Foot
(Maumksuck) who had 6 toes and lived along the banks of Geneva Lake (originally
known as Big Foot Lake) until his tribe was forcibly relocated by the United
States government in 1836.

Extracurricular activities
Big Foot's football team went to the Division 4 state championship game at Camp Randall Stadium in 2008, but lost to Wautoma High School by a score of 20–0. In 2009, the team played in the championship game the second consecutive year, this time facing Kewaunee High School. Big Foot won by a score of 42–13, making it the first State Football title in school history.

Statistics 
Enrollment: 468 (2021–22)
District Administrator: Mr. Doug Parker
Principal: Mr. Jeremy Andersen
Assistant Principals: Ms. Bailey Racky and Mr. Mike Welden
Coeducational: Yes
Colors: Scarlet and Silver

Notable alumni
 Tyler August, Speaker pro tempore of the Wisconsin State Assembly
 Travis Frederick, Center for the Dallas Cowboys (NFL)

References

External links 
Big Foot High School website
Big Foot High School Band Website

1959 establishments in Wisconsin
Educational institutions established in 1959
Public high schools in Wisconsin
Schools in Walworth County, Wisconsin